Hugues Le Bars (13 October 1950 in Versailles Yvelines – 1 November 2014) was a French film music composer.

Filmography 
 Oggy and the Cockroaches - Composer, voice actor (seasons 1–4)
 Oggy and the Cockroaches: The Movie - Voice actor (and reused audio)

His voice clips were also frequently reused, mostly for whenever the cockroaches laughed, in Oggy and the Cockroaches: Next Generation.

Discography 
 1981:  Est-ce le mec
 1989: 1789... ET NOUS (ballet music of Maurice Béjart)
 1991: J'en ai marre
 1995: Zinzin
 1997: Oggy et les Cafards
 2001: Musique pour Versailles
 2010: Massay Massey
 2013: Ettoo

References

1950 births
2014 deaths
French composers
French composers by genre